James Driscoll (15 December 1880 – 30 January 1925), commonly known as Peerless Jim, was a Welsh boxer who learned his trade in the boxing ring and used it to fight his way out of poverty. Driscoll was British featherweight champion and won the coveted Lonsdale belt in 1910. He is a member of the Welsh Sports Hall of Fame, the Ring Magazine Hall of Fame, and the International Boxing Hall of Fame.

Early life
Driscoll was born in Cardiff in 1880 to Cornelius and Elizabeth, and was brought up on Ellen Street in the Newtown region of the town. Driscoll's parents were both Irish, and both Catholicism and the local St Paul's Church would be key in his life. Driscoll never forgot his roots; he was a faithful supporter of his church, remained close to his community, and had great affection for the Nazareth House Orphanage, for whom he once gave up the chance of becoming Featherweight Champion of the World.

Driscoll's father died in a goods yard accident before Driscoll was one. His mother was forced to accept parish relief to bring up her four children, and soon the family moved into a boarding house with another five people in 3 Ellen Street. Elizabeth was forced to take a job shovelling vegetables and fish from the hulls of ships at Cardiff Docks. Growing up in poverty, Driscoll took employment while still a boy, becoming a printer's devil for the Evening Express in St. Mary Street in Cardiff.

Boxing career

Early history

Driscoll was an apprentice with the Western Mail printing works, when he began boxing in the fairground booths of south Wales. He fought on the boxing booths of South Wales for a number of years and had somewhere in the region of 600 fights before turning professional in 1901, and by the end of the year he had secured twelve wins without defeat. The following year, of the seven recorded fights, he only failed to win once, a draw with Harry Mansfield in Cardiff. Between 1903 and 1904 Driscoll continued fighting, mainly in Wales, but on 22 February 1904 he fought his first match at the National Sporting Club in London, a points decision win over Boss Edwards. That year he also suffered his first defeat in a return bout against Mansfield, losing by points in a ten-round clash.

On 26 February 1906, Driscoll took the British Featherweight title by defeating Joe Bowker in a 15-round contest at the National Sporting Club. He undertook four more fights before his first defence, which included beating Mansfield by knockout in their fourth meet. His first title defence, held on 3 June 1907, was a copy of his title win, another contest with Bowker at the National Sporting Club in Covent Garden. This time it was a twenty-round match and Driscoll stopped his opponent in the seventeenth via a knockout.

The 24 August 1907 is recorded as a non-contest fight between Driscoll and fellow Welshman Freddie Welsh. Boxing historians such as Andrew Gallimore have cast doubt on this being a professional contest and instead a display fight at a fairground. Welsh supposedly took advantage of this situation and attacked Driscoll with kidney and rabbit punches. Driscoll never forgave his former friend for taking such liberties.

On 24 February 1908, Driscoll faced New Zealander Charlie Griffin for the vacant Commonwealth Featherweight title. Again fought at Covent Garden, the match went the full fifteen rounds with Driscoll declared champion on a points decision.

Boxing in the US

After claiming the British and Commonwealth featherweight titles Driscoll went to prove himself in the U.S. American boxing fans of the era favoured all-action boxers, but they were won over by the Cardiffian's skills, giving him the nickname 'Peerless Jim.' (Another common nickname for him was "Jem," and in his home town he was affectionately called "The Prince of Wales.") Featherweight champion Abe Attell faced Driscoll in 1910; the Welshman dominated the fight, but with the "no decision" rule in place, without a KO he couldn't take the crown. Driscoll declined a rematch in order to attend an exhibition match in aid of the orphans of St. Nazareth House: "I never break a promise." He returned to the United States the next year, but a chest infection and an injury in a road accident sustained just days before meant a poor showing when he faced Pal Moore, losing by newspaper decision. He returned shortly after to Britain, and never got his title shot at Attell.

After becoming the first featherweight to win a Lonsdale Belt, Driscoll prepared for an eagerly-anticipated fight against Freddie Welsh. The match was a disappointment, though, as Welsh's spoiling tactics upset Driscoll's style. By the 10th round, Driscoll's frustration boiled over, and he was disqualified for butting Welsh.

Later years

Driscoll's boxing career was interrupted by World War I, where he was recruited as a physical training advisor, enlisting in 1914 in the Welsh Horse Yeomanry. In succeeding years, he continued to box despite failing health, relying on his skills to keep him out of trouble. When he died in Cardiff of consumption at the age of 44, over 100,000 people lined the streets for his funeral. He is buried at Cathays Cemetery in Cardiff, Wales. He authored a number of books on boxing; Text Book of Boxing, Outfighting, Ringcraft and most notably The Straight Left and How to Cultivate It, were widely printed and are still respected as instruction books of the sport today. In 1997 a statue was erected in his honour near the Central Boys' Club where he had trained.

Record
Driscoll's final official record is 58-3-6, with 39 KO's, however due to the scoring practices of the time, that yields 6 no-contest bouts on his record. Newspapers used to announce a winner in no-contest bouts, and taking that into account, his true record is 63-4-6 with 39 KO's.

Professional boxing record
All information in this section is derived from BoxRec, unless otherwise stated.

Official record

All newspaper decisions are officially regarded as “no decision” bouts and are not counted in the win/loss/draw column.

Unofficial record

Record with the inclusion of newspaper decisions in the win/loss/draw column.

Legacy
Driscoll bequeathed his Lonsdale Belt to his cousin, Tom Burns, who ran the Royal Oak Hotel in Adamsdown, Cardiff. Today the pub is decorated with Jim Driscoll and other boxing memorabilia.

In January 2016 an hour long documentary about him, "Jim Driscoll: Meistr y Sgwâr" (Jim Driscoll: Master of the Ring), was broadcast on the S4C television channel.

See also
 List of British featherweight boxing champions

Notes

Bibliography
Cordell, Alexander (1984, 2014). Peerless Jim. London. Hodder & Stoughton.

External links
 
Cardiff.org article on 'Peerless' Jim Driscoll
Fight Beat article on Driscoll

1880 births
1925 deaths
Military personnel from Cardiff
Burials in Cardiff
Welsh male boxers
Boxers from Cardiff
20th-century deaths from tuberculosis
British Army personnel of World War I
Royal Army Physical Training Corps soldiers
Featherweight boxers
Tuberculosis deaths in Wales
Welsh people of Irish descent
European Boxing Union champions